The 1949 Toronto Argonauts finished in third place in the Interprovincial Rugby Football Union with a 5–7–0 record and failed to make the playoffs.

Regular season

Standings

Schedule

References

Toronto Argonauts seasons
1949 Canadian football season by team